Boyd Hill Nature Preserve is a  protected area in St. Petersburg, Florida, Pinellas County, Florida. The preserve is located on the shores of Lake Maggiore (Florida) in south St. Petersburg. It is operated by St. Petersburg Parks and Recreation and includes the Boyd Hill Environmental Center, a bird-of-prey aviary, and more than three miles of trails through a variety of ecosystems. Facilities include a playground and picnic areas. The preserve is used for school field trips and hosts environmental education programs. It is located at 1101 Country Club Way South.

There are many metal statues built by the late Paul Eppling. A long time resident of St. Petersburg, Paul used recycled metal and scrap metal for his sculptures.

Ecosystem

 Lake Maggiore 
 Swamp - Connected to Lake Maggiore.
 Pine Flatwoods
 Sand Scrub - Sand Scrub has about 2% of its original habitat remaining. In Florida, it is known as one of the most endangered habitats. Rare, sensitive plants grow here.
 Hammock

References

External links
Boyd Hill Nature Preserve website
Boyd Hill Nature Preserve website St. Pete Parks and Recreation

Protected areas of Pinellas County, Florida
Nature reserves in Florida
Nature centers in Florida
Geography of St. Petersburg, Florida
Tourist attractions in St. Petersburg, Florida